In enzymology, a D-arabinose 1-dehydrogenase is an enzyme that catalyzes the chemical reaction

D-arabinose + NAD+  D-arabinono-1,4-lactone + NADH + H+

Thus, the two substrates of this enzyme are D-arabinose and NAD+, whereas its 3 products are D-arabinono-1,4-lactone, NADH, and H+.

This enzyme belongs to the family of oxidoreductases, specifically those acting on the CH-OH group of donor with NAD+ or NADP+ as acceptor. The systematic name of this enzyme class is D-arabinose:NAD+ 1-oxidoreductase. Other names in common use include NAD+-pentose-dehydrogenase, and arabinose(fucose)dehydrogenase.

References

 
 

EC 1.1.1
NADH-dependent enzymes
Enzymes of unknown structure